Mineo is a town and comune in Catania, Sicily, Italy.

Mineo may also refer to:

Mineo (name)
Mineo (meteorite), a meteorite fallen near Mineo (Sicily, Italy)
Agrippina of Mineo (d. 262AD), venerated as a virgin martyr in the Catholic Church